The Henry C. Peak House, on Sparta Pike in Warsaw, Kentucky, was listed on the National Register of Historic Places in 1980.

It was built in 1869 by Henry Clay Peak (1832-1913), a Confederate veteran of the Civil War.

It "is an example of the Gothic Revival style, embodying the cross-axis plan which appears to be unique to the Gallatin County area....the house exhibits a high degree of craftsmanship that makes it one of the best examples of this design in this region of northern Kentucky. The style combined with the plan (Gothic Revival, cross-axis) appears to be somewhat unusual for the regions outside northern Kentucky, but not uncommon however, in this particular area. The expertise and skill evident in the construction of this building makes it one of the superior examples of this design. The fine brickwork is one of the features of note. Also, the round arched hood molds on the second story windows are uncommonly well laid, with a deep but even profile."

It later served as the Warsaw Women's Club Building.

References

Houses on the National Register of Historic Places in Kentucky
Gothic Revival architecture in Kentucky
Houses completed in 1869
National Register of Historic Places in Gallatin County, Kentucky
Individually listed contributing properties to historic districts on the National Register in Kentucky
1869 establishments in Kentucky
History of women in Kentucky
Clubhouses on the National Register of Historic Places in Kentucky
Women's clubs in the United States